Brad Jenkins (born c. 1954) is a former American football player and coach.

Playing career 
Jenkins played tight end for the Nebraska Cornhuskers from 1972 through 1975.  He was drafted into by the Tampa Bay Buccaneers in the 13th round of the 1976 NFL Draft, but never played a regular season game in the National Football League (NFL).

Coaching career
Jenkins was the 18th head football coach at Kansas Wesleyan University in Salina, Kansas and he held that position for nine seasons, from 1987 until 1995.  His coaching record at Kansas Wesleyan was 49–40.

Head coaching record

References

1950s births
Living people
American football tight ends
Kansas Wesleyan Coyotes football coaches
Nebraska Cornhuskers football players
Sportspeople from Fort Collins, Colorado
People from North Platte, Nebraska
Players of American football from Nebraska